Tara Leigh Grove is an American legal scholar and professor at the University of Texas School of Law.

Career 
Grove attended Duke University and Harvard Law School, and subsequently served as a law clerk for Emilio Garza before working for the United States Department of Justice for four years. Grove began teaching at the Florida State University College of Law in 2009, and joined the faculty of the College of William & Mary in 2011, where she was named Mills E. Godwin, Jr. Professor of Law. In 2020, Grove accepted an appointment as the Charles E. Tweedy, Jr. Endowed Chairholder in Law at the University of Alabama School of Law. She served on the Presidential Commission on the Supreme Court of the United States. In Summer 2022, Grove left the University of Alabama School of Law for the University of Texas School of Law, where she currently serves as the Vinson & Elkins Chair in Law.

References

Duke University alumni
Harvard Law School alumni
Living people
Year of birth missing (living people)
University of Alabama faculty
College of William & Mary faculty
Florida State University faculty
United States Department of Justice lawyers
American women legal scholars
American legal scholars